Falstone railway station is a former railway station that served the hamlet of Falstone, in Northumberland, England.

History 
The station was on the Border Counties Railway which linked the Newcastle and Carlisle Railway, near Hexham, with the Border Union Railway at Riccarton Junction. The first section of the route was opened between Hexham and Chollerford in 1858, the remainder opening 1861–1862. The line was closed to passengers by British Railways in 1956.

The station had a single platform and a stone built station building both of which survived the line's closure. The station building is residential accommodation and offices.

References

External links 
Falstone Station on Disused Stations
Falstone Station on a navigable 1955 O. S. map

Disused railway stations in Northumberland
Former North British Railway stations
Railway stations in Great Britain opened in 1861
Railway stations in Great Britain closed in 1956
1861 establishments in England